Fairfield, Tennessee may refer to the following places in Tennessee:
Fairfield, Bedford County, Tennessee, an unincorporated community
Fairfield, Blount County, Tennessee, an unincorporated community
Fairfield, Sumner County, Tennessee, a census-designated place